MimoDB is a database of peptides that have been selected from random peptide libraries based on their ability to bind small compounds, nucleic acids, proteins, cells, and tissues through phage display.

See also
 Mimotope
 Phage display

References

External links
 https://web.archive.org/web/20121116054757/http://immunet.cn/mimodb/.

Biological databases
Biochemistry methods